The Landesarchiv Speyer is a German state archive responsible for the supervision of public authorities, public institutions and municipalities in Rheinhessen-Pfalz. 

Its archives includes approximately 25,000 documents and 33,000 maps. One of its oldest archives includes a copy of the monastery of Weissenburg from the 9th century, as well as holdings from the era of the Holy Roman Empire. The archives are accessible to the general public.

References

External links 
 Homepage of the Landesarchivs Speyer

Archives in Germany